Stepronin is a mucolytic and expectorant.

References 

Expectorants
Thiophenes
Carboxamides
Thioesters